Finding Samuel Lowe: From Harlem to China, is a 2015 Jamaican documentary film directed and produced by Jeanette Kong. The film revolves around the a former television executive, Paula Williams Madison and her two older brothers; Elrick and Howard Williams go on a search to find out what happened to their Chinese maternal grandfather Samuel Lowe, who left their Chinese-Jamaican mother Nell Vera Lowe Williams, in the 1930s in Jamaica. Nell travelled to the United States from Jamaica in 1945.

The film received positive reviews and won several awards at international film festivals. Its national premiere was on May 14, 2017 World Channel’s Doc World and was stream online for free from May 15–June 13, 2017. The film had its screening on 8 February 2014 at Pan African Film Festival.

Cast
 Paula Williams Madison
 Elrick Williams	
 Howard Williams	
 Vincent J. Chang	
 Stephen Young Chin	
 Anthony 'Harry' Harrison	
 Ouida Harrison	
 Andrea Lowe
 Anthony 'Tony' Lowe	
 Chow Woo Lowe	
 Keith Lowe	
 Loraine Lowe	
 Minjun Luo	
 Siqi Luo	
 Seth George Ramocan	
 Carol Wong	
 Dalton Yap

References

External links
 
 Finding Samuel Lowe Discussing Panel on YouTube
 Finding samuel lowe: from harlem to china
 New documentary explores woman's journey from Harlem to China
 Film Screening:Finding Samuel Lowe: From Harlem to China

2014 documentary films
Jamaican documentary films
2010s English-language films